"Desolation Row" is a 1965 song by the American singer-songwriter Bob Dylan. It was recorded on August 4, 1965, and released as the closing track of Dylan's sixth studio album, Highway 61 Revisited. It has been noted for its length (11:21) and surreal lyrics in which Dylan weaves characters into a series of vignettes that suggest entropy and urban chaos.

"Desolation Row" is often ranked as one of Dylan's greatest compositions.

Recording
Although the album version of "Desolation Row" is acoustic, the song was initially recorded in an electric version.  The first take was recorded during an evening session on July 29, 1965, with Harvey Brooks on electric bass and Al Kooper on electric guitar. This version was eventually released in 2005 on The Bootleg Series Vol. 7: No Direction Home: The Soundtrack.

On August 2, Dylan recorded five further takes of "Desolation Row".  The Highway 61 Revisited version was recorded at an overdub session on August 4, 1965, in Columbia's Studio A in New York City. Nashville-based guitarist Charlie McCoy, who happened to be in New York, was invited by producer Bob Johnston to contribute an improvised acoustic guitar part and Russ Savakus played bass guitar. Author Mark Polizzotti credits some of the success of the song to McCoy's contribution: "While Dylan's panoramic lyrics and hypnotic melody sketch out the vast canvas, it is McCoy's fills that give it their shading." Outtakes from the August sessions were released on The Bootleg Series Vol. 12: The Cutting Edge 1965–1966 in 2015.

Interpretation
When asked where "Desolation Row" was located, at a TV press conference in San Francisco on December 3, 1965, Dylan replied: "Oh, that's some place in Mexico, it's across the border. It's noted for its Coke factory." Al Kooper, who played electric guitar on the first recordings of "Desolation Row", suggested that it was located on a stretch of Eighth Avenue, Manhattan, "an area infested with whore houses, sleazy bars and porno supermarkets totally beyond renovation or redemption". Polizzotti suggests that both the inspiration and title of the song may have come from Desolation Angels by Jack Kerouac and Cannery Row by John Steinbeck.

When Jann Wenner asked Dylan in 1969 whether Allen Ginsberg had influenced his songs, Dylan replied: "I think he did at a certain period. That period of... 'Desolation Row,' that kind of New York type period, when all the songs were just city songs. His poetry is city poetry. Sounds like the city."

The south-western flavored acoustic guitar backing and eclecticism of the imagery led Polizzotti to describe "Desolation Row" as the "ultimate cowboy song, the 'Home On The Range' of the frightening territory that was mid-sixties America". In the penultimate verse the passengers on the Titanic are "shouting 'Which Side Are You On?'", a slogan of left-wing politics, so, for Robert Shelton, one of the targets of this song is "simpleminded political commitment. What difference which side you're on if you're sailing on the Titanic?" In an interview with USA Today on September 10, 2001, the day before the release of his album Love and Theft, Dylan claimed that the song is "a minstrel song through and through. I saw some ragtag minstrel show in blackface at the carnivals when I was growing up, and it had an effect on me, just as much as seeing the lady with four legs."

The song opens with a report that "they're selling postcards of the hanging", and notes "the circus is in town". Polizzotti, and other critics, have connected this song with the lynching of three black men in Duluth. The men were employed by a traveling circus and had been accused of raping a white woman. On the night of June 15, 1920, they were removed from custody and hanged on the corner of First Street and Second Avenue East. Photos of the lynching were sold as postcards. Duluth was Bob Dylan's birthplace. Dylan's father, Abram Zimmerman, was eight years old at the time of the lynchings, and lived only two blocks from the scene. Abram Zimmerman passed the story on to his son.

Reception and legacy
"Desolation Row" has been described as Dylan's most ambitious work up to that date. In the New Oxford Companion to Music, Gammond described "Desolation Row" as an example of Dylan's work that achieved a "high level of poetical lyricism." Clinton Heylin notes that Dylan is writing a song as long as traditional folk ballads, such as "Tam Lin" and "Matty Groves", and in that classic ballad metre, but without any linear narrative thread.

When he reviewed the Highway 61 Revisited album for The Daily Telegraph in 1965, the English poet Philip Larkin described the song as a "marathon", with an "enchanting tune and mysterious, possibly half-baked words". For Andy Gill the song is "an 11-minute epic of entropy, which takes the form of a Fellini-esque parade of grotesques and oddities featuring a huge cast of iconic characters, some historical (Albert Einstein, Nero), some biblical (Noah, Cain and Abel), some fictional (Ophelia, Romeo, Cinderella), some literary (T. S. Eliot and Ezra Pound), and some who fit into none of the above categories, notably Dr. Filth and his dubious nurse."

According to the music historian Nicholas Schaffner, "Desolation Row" was the longest popular music track, until the Rolling Stones released "Goin' Home" (11:35) in 1966.

Rolling Stone ranks the song as number 83 in their 500 Greatest Songs of All Time. In 2020, The Guardian and GQ ranked the song number five and number three, respectively, on their lists of the 50 greatest Bob Dylan songs.

Dylan played the Isle of Wight Festival 1969, and "Desolation Row" was the name given to the hillside area used by the 600,000 ticketless fans at the 1970 event, before the fence was torn down.

Live performance
Dylan debuted "Desolation Row" at Forest Hills Tennis Stadium in Queens, New York, on August 28, 1965, after he "controversially went electric" at the 1965 Newport Folk Festival. It was part of the acoustic set Dylan played before bringing on his electric band. Of the performance, music critic Robert Shelton stated that "the song, another of Mr. Dylan's musical Rorschachs capable of widely varied interpretation... It can best be characterized as a "folk song of the absurd." The displaced images and Kafkaesque cavalcade of historical characters were at first greeted with laughter.

Live versions are included on Dylan's albums MTV Unplugged (1995; recorded November 1994), The Bootleg Series Vol. 4: Bob Dylan Live 1966, The "Royal Albert Hall" Concert (1998; recorded May 1966), The 1966 Live Recordings (2016 boxed set; multiple recording dates, with one concert released separately on the album The Real Royal Albert Hall 1966 Concert), and Live 1962-1966: Rare Performances From The Copyright Collections (2018; recorded April 1966). The song has been featured in live performances as recently as November 19, 2012. The song is included on some set lists on Dylan's current tour and was played in Bournemouth on May 4, 2017.

Other renditions

My Chemical Romance

My Chemical Romance recorded a cover of "Desolation Row" for the 2009 soundtrack of the film Watchmen. The song peaked at number 20 on the Billboard Modern Rock Tracks in March, 2009. The first chapter of the comic on which the film is based ("At Midnight All the Agents") takes its name from a line in the song. This line is also quoted at the end of the chapter.

The music video for My Chemical Romance's version was directed by Zack Snyder, who also directed the Watchmen film and, as a result, features similar effects to that of the film, though no actual footage of the film appears. It features the band playing in an old-school punk arena, with visual similarities to the "Pale Horse" concert referenced in the graphic novel. After the show becomes sold out and dozens of fans can't get in, a riot ensues as the band plays on. Eventually the police arrive but are too powerless to stop the rioting both inside the show and out. Later a SWAT team arrives, arrests the band, and disperses the rioters.

During MCR's parts in the video multiple elements of Watchmen imagery (such as Rorschach's mask and The Comedian's smiley face button) are seen. The pink elephant balloon from both the comic and the film is also seen at the beginning of the video.

Charts

Other cover versions
The Grateful Dead performed a version of "Desolation Row" from the mid-1980s onwards. The song is included on their 2002 release Postcards of the Hanging, the album name alluding to the lyrics of "Desolation Row". The album features a recording from March 24, 1990, at the Knickerbocker Arena in Albany, New York. The song was frequently abbreviated in Dead set lists to "D-Row."

Chris Smither recorded the song on his 2003 album Train Home with Bonnie Raitt providing backup on vocals and slide guitar. It has also been recorded by Robyn Hitchcock on the album Robyn Sings.

Old 97's singer Rhett Miller borrowed "Desolation Row"'s melody for a new song, "Champaign, Illinois". It was recorded with Dylan's blessing and appears on Old 97's 2010 album The Grande Theatre, Volume One, with Dylan and Miller sharing writing credit.

Italian singer-songwriters Fabrizio de André and Francesco De Gregori wrote "Via della Povertà", an Italian translation of "Desolation Row", and included it on 1974 album Canzoni.

References in popular culture
Laura Branigan's 1985 single "Spanish Eddie" mentions the song in its chorus, "The night Spanish Eddie cashed it in / they were playin' "Desolation Row" on the radio" 

"Desolation Row" is one of DIO's 14 phrases for attaining Heaven in the sixth story arc of JoJo's Bizarre Adventure.

A line from the song "At midnight, all the agents and the superhuman crew, go out and round up everyone that knows more than they do." is the closing quotation in chapter 1 of "Watchmen" by Alan Moore and Dave Gibbons.  In a foreword for the collected editions of the series, Dave Gibbons claims "it began with Bob Dylan", that the lyrics reproduced for chapter 1 were the "spark that would one day ignite WATCHMEN."

The title track of The War on Drugs' fifth album I Don't Live Here Anymore contains the lyrics, "Like when we went to see Bob Dylan/ We danced to "Desolation Row"".

References
Explanatory notes

Citations

Bibliography

External links
 "Desolation Row", complete song lyrics
 Rolling Stone article on "Desolation Row" as the 187th Greatest Song of All Time 

1965 songs
Songs written by Bob Dylan
Bob Dylan songs
My Chemical Romance songs
Song recordings produced by Bob Johnston
1960s ballads
Folk ballads
Rock ballads